İnkaya Cave is a cave located on the eastern slope of Mount Kocadağ at Yelki village in Güzelbahçe, Izmir, western Turkey.

The dry cave is developed generally horizontal and partly vertical dry cave. Potsherds found in the cave point the cave was used as a settlement in ancient times.

The cave's geological-geomorphological constitution resulted from some intersectional fractures inside a Cretaceous limestone formation. A wide hall is formed after a steep descent. The hall continues in an inclined gallery towards south. At the end of gallery, a -deep hole leads to the cave's lowest level and the end.

References

Caves of Turkey
Landforms of İzmir Province
Güzelbahçe District